Teresa Ann (Terry) McCahill (born 1 September 1970) is a former New Zealand association football player who represented her country.

McCahill made her Football Ferns debut in a 3–0 win over Australia on 23 October 1991 and ended her international career with 40 caps and 1 goal to her credit.

McCahill represented New Zealand at the Women's World Cup finals in China in 1991 playing all 3 group games; a 0–3 loss to Denmark, a 0–4 loss to Norway and a 1–4 loss to China.

References

External links

1970 births
Living people
New Zealand women's international footballers
New Zealand women's association footballers
1991 FIFA Women's World Cup players
Women's association football defenders